Travis Andre Johnson (born April 26, 1982) is a former American football defensive end. He was drafted by the Houston Texans in the first round of the 2005 NFL Draft. He played college football at Florida State.

He has also played for the San Diego Chargers.

High school career

Johnson was born Los Angeles, and raised in Oak Park/Agoura (which he moved to when he was in fifth grade), a suburban town about 30 miles north of Los Angeles. Johnson attended Oak Park High School his freshman year before transferring to Notre Dame High School in Sherman Oaks, California. He earned Parade, PrepStar, Football News and USA Today All-America first-team honors as a senior. Johnson recorded 104 tackles, including 32 for loss, and 17 sacks as a senior for the Knights while also setting school records for career sacks (61), tackles for loss (77), forced fumbles (14), and blocked punts (five).

Before attending Notre Dame High School, Johnson played for his hometown of Oak Park, California for one year, playing junior varsity football and varsity basketball.

College career
He also played forward on the basketball team, and in track and field he competed in the shot put and the 100 meter dash.
Johnson, a highly touted recruit coming out of high school, chose to attend Florida State University.  He started all 12 games at left defensive tackle during his senior year and was an All-ACC first-team choice after recording 50 tackles with 2.5 sacks, 18 tackles for loss, and 12 quarterback pressures. As well as an AP All-American (third team).

Professional career

Houston Texans
Projected as a mid-first rounder by Sports Illustrated, Johnson was ranked as the best defensive tackle available in the 2005 NFL Draft. Johnson was selected by the Houston Texans in the first round (16th overall). Johnson saw limited playing time due to injuries.

San Diego Chargers
Johnson was traded to the San Diego Chargers on August 31, 2009 for a sixth round pick in the 2010 NFL Draft.

NFL statistics

Key
 GP: games played
 COMB: combined tackles
 TOTAL: total tackles
 AST: assisted tackles
 SACK: sacks
 FF: forced fumbles
 FR: fumble recoveries
 FR YDS: fumble return yards 
 INT: interceptions
 IR YDS: interception return yards
 AVG IR: average interception return
 LNG: longest interception return
 TD: interceptions returned for touchdown
 PD: passes defensed

References

External links

San Diego Chargers bio

1982 births
Living people
People from Oak Park, California
Players of American football from California
American football defensive tackles
Florida State Seminoles football players
Houston Texans players
San Diego Chargers players
Sportspeople from Ventura County, California